NGC 361 is an open cluster in the Small Magellanic Cloud. It is located in the constellation Tucana. It was discovered on September 6, 1826 by James Dunlop. It was described by Dreyer as "very very faint, pretty large, very little extended, very gradually brighter middle." At an aperture of 31.0 arcseconds, its apparent V-band magnitude is 12.24, but at this wavelength, it has 0.40 magnitudes of interstellar extinction.

NGC 361 is about 8.1 billion years old. All else equal, older star clusters have higher mass-to-luminosity ratios; that is, they have lower luminosities for the same mass.

See also 
 List of NGC objects (1–1000)

References

External links 
 
 
 SEDS

0361
18260906
Tucana (constellation)
Small Magellanic Cloud
Open clusters
Discoveries by James Dunlop